Anabel Martínez Castillo (born 26 June 1992) is a Spanish football defender, currently playing for Alzira.

Career

Martínez started playing football at the age of 11 with friends in Llombai. By the age of 12, she had joined Levante. At club level, Martínez has represented Levante, Mislata and Alzira. At international level, she was the captain of the Spain under-17 team in the 2009 U-17 European Championship.

Martínez most often operates as a centre-back but does sometimes play as a left-back.

References

1992 births
Living people
Spanish women's footballers
Primera División (women) players
Levante UD Femenino players
Women's association football defenders
Footballers from Valencia (city)